Frank Joseph Hughes (November 26, 1883 – April 14, 1967) was a Canadian lawyer and puisne judge of the Supreme Court of Canada.

Born in Peel County, Ontario, the son of James Hughes and Winnifred Mullarkey, he received a Bachelor of Arts degree from Queen's University in 1907 and studied at Osgoode Hall Law School. In 1911, he was called to the Bar of Ontario. He practised law until he was appointed to the Supreme Court of Canada on March 17, 1933.  He resigned on February 13, 1935.

External links
 Supreme Court of Canada biography

1883 births
1967 deaths
Justices of the Supreme Court of Canada
Lawyers in Ontario
Osgoode Hall Law School alumni